An Intrusion is a 2021 American thriller film written and directed by Nicholas Holland and starring Keir Gilchrist and Scout Taylor-Compton.

Cast
Dustin Prince as Sam Hodges
Keir Gilchrist as Layne Lewis
Billy Boyd as Minister Fairfield
Scout Taylor-Compton as Detective Savannah Simpson
Sam Logan Khaleghi as Chris
Erika Hoveland as Joyce Hodges
Michael Emery as Devin
Angelina Danielle Cama as Rebecca Hodges
Kayla Kelly as Julia Hilt
Jaime Zevallos as Detective Castillo
Jerry Narsh as Detective Marsh
Allison Megroet as Mel

Production
Principal photography took place in December 2019 in Detroit and Oakland County, Michigan.

More principal photography occurred in Michigan in August 2020.

In September 2021, it was announced that Gravitas Ventures acquired North American distribution rights to the film.

Release
The film premiered at the Chelsea Film Festival on October 14, 2021.  It was then released in the United States and Canada on November 26, 2021.

Reception
Michael Talbot-Haynes of Film Threat rated the film a 7.5 out of 10.

Cody Hamman of JoBlo.com gave the film a positive review and wrote, "The cast is quite good all around, with Hoveland doing some impressive work in the emotional moments she was given."

References

External links
 
 

2021 films
American thriller films
Films shot in Michigan
Films shot in Detroit
2020s English-language films
2020s American films